Tenrecinae is a tenrec  subfamily endemic to the island of Madagascar. It contains the largest species in the family, Tenrec ecaudatus. All members of the genus possess spines, analogous to those of hedgehogs, for defense against predators.

Tenrecinae is thought to have split from the lineages of all other extant tenrecs about 36 million years (Ma) ago. The deepest phylogenetic split within the subfamily, that between two clades composed of Echinops plus Setifer and Hemicentetes plus Tenrec, is thought to have occurred about 26 Ma ago. In turn, Hemicentetes is thought to have diverged from Tenrec about 16 Ma ago, and Echinops from Setifer about 10 Ma ago.

Extant species 

Subfamily Tenrecinae
 Tribe: Setiferini
 Genus Echinops
 Lesser hedgehog tenrec (E. telfairi)
 Genus Setifer
 Greater hedgehog tenrec (S. setosus)
 Tribe: Tenrecini
 Genus Hemicentetes
 Highland streaked tenrec (H. nigriceps)
 Lowland streaked tenrec (H. semispinosus)
 Genus Tenrec
 Tailless tenrec (T. ecaudatus)

See also
Convergent evolution
List of mammals of Madagascar

References

Afrosoricida
Mammal subfamilies
Taxa named by John Edward Gray